Hijaz College is a British Muslim school located in Nuneaton, Warwickshire, England. Hijaz College combines traditional Islamic education with the British National Curriculum. The philosophy of Hijaz was formulated by its patron and founder Abdul Wahab Siddiqi (1942–94) in 1994.

 its principal was his eldest son Shaykh Faiz-ul-Aqtab Siddiqi. The Jamia Islamia in Coventry, founded in 1979, produced dozens of graduates who became fully qualified Ulema (scholars of Islam) and doctors, lawyers, engineers etc.

As of 2008, Hijaz College is run by the Chief Executive Shaikh Tauqir Ishaq, a chartered civil engineer by profession and Islamic scholar. The LLB law degree is also taught combined with religious sciences.  Graduates of Hijaz College are awarded a Bachelor of Arts in Islamic Law and Theology and are qualified in Islamic jurisprudence, Qur'anic and Hadith sciences and Arabic etymology.

In 1994 the vision of Hijaz College started to take a different shape in the form of Hijaz College Islamic University. The college takes its name from the region in modern-day Saudi Arabia which comprises Mecca, Medina and Taif.

Its plans include extended teaching facilities and resources including a library which will display over 700,000 books.

Hijaz College is independent from any governmental organisation.

In December 2007, the UK's first official sharia court was set up at Hijaz college. By September 2008, it had settled more than 100 civil disputes between Muslims. Once parties have agreed to bring their case before the sharia tribunal, they are bound to its decision by English law.

References

External links 
 Hijaz College Website

Islamic schools in England
Education in Warwickshire
Nuneaton